Carrier Strike Group Twelve (CSG-12 or CARSTRKGRU 12) is one of four U.S. Navy carrier strike groups currently assigned to the United States Fleet Forces Command.  is the aircraft carrier assigned as the strike group's flagship.

Strike group aircraft flew over 13,000 air combat missions in support of coalition ground forces in Iraq and Afghanistan, including 2006's Operation Medusa and Operation Mountain Fury in Iraq. The group's surface warships were also involved in several high-profile anti-piracy operations. The group participated in the multilateral exercises Anatolian Sun 2006, Reliant Mermaid 2007, BALTOPS 2008, and Malabar 2015; the bilateral exercise Inspired Union 2006; and the joint exercise Exercise Bold Alligator 2012.

The 2015 deployment was led by its new flagship, which has since left the group and shifted homeport to Naval Base San Diego, California. Carrier Strike Group Twelve was the first U.S. Navy carrier strike group to deploy with a Naval Integrated Fire Control-Counter Air (NIFC-CA) capability that integrates all units via a data link to gain a more comprehensive overview of its operational battlespace. To augment this NIFC-CA capability, the strike group embarked the new E-2D airborne early warning (AEW) aircraft, making its first overseas deployment.

Predecessor history 1966-2004
Commanding CRUDESFLOT 8 at the time was Rear Admiral John D. Bulkeley.

On 30 June 1973, Commander Cruiser Destroyer Flotilla 8 was re-designated as Commander Cruiser-Destroyer Group 8 (CCDG-8). The group took part in Operation Southern Watch and Operation Deny Flight.

In 1986, while commanding Cruiser-Destroyer Group 8, Rear Admiral David E. Jeremiah commanded the Saratoga group and Task Group 60.2 of the U.S. Sixth Fleet during a series of operations code-named Attain Document. They were intended to assert freedom of navigation in the Gulf of Sidra as well as to challenge Libya's maritime territorial claims. The Saratoga battle group and the rest of Task Force 60 later carried out Operation El Dorado Canyon, a series of punitive air strikes against Libya in retaliations to the 1986 Berlin discotheque bombing. During both operations, Admiral Jeremiah commanded Task Force 60, the three-carrier task force of the Sixth Fleet, code-named Battle Force Zulu.

In the middle of 1992, there was a Navy reorganization. Each of the Navy's 12 existing carrier battle groups was planned to consist of an aircraft carrier; an embarked carrier air wing; cruiser, destroyer, and frigate units; and two nuclear-powered attack submarines. The group's composition after the reorganization can be seen below.

Cruiser-Destroyer Group Eight, late 1992

On 30 September 1992, when Saratoga accidentally fired two Sea Sparrow missiles at the Turkish 
destroyer minelayer , during Exercise 'Display Determination '92,' Commander Cruiser-Destroyer Group Eight was embarked.

During the early period of the 2003 invasion of Iraq, Commander Cruiser-Destroyer Group Eight was embarked aboard Theodore Roosevelt as a part of Task Force 60, striking Iraqi targets from the Mediterranean Sea.

On 1 September 2004, Rear Admiral James W. Stevenson, Jr., Commander Cruiser-Destroyer Group Eight, took command of the Enterprise group. Admiral Stevenson had been in command of Cruiser-Destroyer Group Eight since May 2004. Formerly, the Enterprise Carrier Strike Group had been under the command of Commander Cruiser-Destroyer Group 12 based in Naval Station Mayport, Florida. On 1 October 2004, Cruiser-Destroyer Group 8 was re-designated as Carrier Strike Group Twelve.

History 2004 onwards
On 3 September 2004, the group's flagship Enterprise entered the Newport News shipyard for an extended selected restricted availability overhaul. On 13 October 2005, the Enterprise pulled away from Norfolk Naval Station's Pier 12 for sea trials. Enterprises post-overhaul sea trials ended on 15 October 2005.

2006 deployment

On 2 May 2006, the strike group departed Naval Station Norfolk, Virginia, for its 2006 deployment under the command of Rear Admiral Ray Spicer. The group trained with naval forces from Bulgaria, Germany, Croatia, and Greece during its transit through the Mediterranean. The frigate Nichols participated in Anatolian Sun, a Proliferation Security Initiative exercise, held between 24 and 26 May 2006 hosted for the first time by Turkey.

The group spent two periods with the U.S. Fifth Fleet during its 2006 deployment. During the deployment, Carrier Air Wing One delivered 65,000 pounds (29,483.50 kilograms) of ordnance, including 137 precision weapons, to provide air support of Operation Enduring Freedom – Afghanistan and Operation Iraqi Freedom. Its aircraft completed more than 8,300 sorties, of which 2,186 were combat missions while flying more than 22,500 hours and making 6,916-day and night arrested landings. Carrier Air Wing One provided the first combat air support to Operation Enduring Freedom from an aircraft carrier in more than three years.

The first Fifth Fleet rotation began when the strike group entered the Persian Gulf on 6 June 2006. During this initial rotation, Carrier Air Wing One flew 781 sorties in support of Coalition ground forces in Afghanistan for a total of 3,832 flight hours. The air wing also flew an additional 237 sorties in support of ground forces in Iraq for a total of 455 flight hours. Carrier Strike Group Twelve ended this first operational phase and departed the Persian Gulf on 6 July 2006. 
The strike group subsequently conducted a two-month deployment with the U.S. Seventh Fleet in the Western Pacific which included training exercises with Carrier Strike Group Five. This was the first time that an East Coast-based carrier air wing had operated in the western Pacific in 18 years, and the first time that the carrier  had operated in the Pacific since its transfer to the U.S. Atlantic Fleet.

On 28 August 2006, the group rejoined the Fifth Fleet and began its second rotation in the Persian Gulf on 8 September 2006. Beginning on 2 September 2006, the strike group provided combat air support (pictured) for two major ground operations, with coalition forces engaging Taliban insurgents in the Kandahar Province as part of Operation Medusa while Operation Mountain Fury targeted Taliban forces in the Paktika, Khost, Ghazni, Paktia, Logar provinces adjacent to the Pakistani border. All four strike fighter squadrons from Carrier Air Wing One flew more than 450 sorties and delivered over 100 precision weapons during this second rotation to the Persian Gulf which ended on 1 November 2006. Carrier Strike Group Twelve returned to Norfolk on 18 November 2006.
2006 deployment force composition

2006 deployment combat operations, exercises, and port visits

2007 deployment

On 7 July 2007, the group departed Naval Station Norfolk, Virginia, for its 2007 deployment under the command of Rear Admiral Daniel P. Holloway. The group entered the U.S. Sixth Fleet area of responsibility on 16 July 2007. Seven days later, on 23 July 2007, two French Rafale M jet fighters landed on board the Enterprise and were subsequently launched, a first for an American aircraft carrier. The group then visited Cannes, France.

The group entered the U.S. Fifth Fleet area on 1 August 2007 and began air operations over the Persian Gulf on 12 August 2007. During its 2007 deployment to the U.S. Fifth Fleet, aircraft from Carrier Air Wing One flew more than 7,500 missions, which included 1,676 combat missions, and made more than 6,500 arrested landings for a total of 20,300 hours. Aircraft dropped 73 air-to-ground weapons and fired 4,149 rounds of 20-mm ammunition in support of ground forces in Iraq and Afghanistan. Strike group units also protected the Iraqi oil terminals at Al Başrah and Khor Al Amaya.

On 25 September 2007, the Tanzanian-flagged passenger ferry Spice Islander I was off the coast of Somalia when she experienced engine problems due to contaminated fuel. After the alarm had been raised via Kenya, the destroyer Stout, operating with Combined Task Force 150, was dispatched to her aid. Spice Islander had been on a voyage from Oman to Tanzania, and it was not carrying any passengers. The destroyer James E. Williams also responded. After her engines were restarted, she resumed her voyage to Tanzania.

On the morning of 30 October 2007, Combined Maritime Forces received a call from the International Maritime Bureau in Malaysia, regarding the North Korean cargo vessel Dai Hong Dan (pictured), which had been taken over the previous day by Somali pirates. Williams arrived in the vicinity of the Korean ship at midday, local time, and contacted the pirates, ordering them to give up their weapons. The Korean crew then confronted the Somali pirates and regained control of the ship. The crew said the pirates had been in control of the bridge, but the crew had retained control of the steering and engineering spaces. The James E. Williams crew provided care and assistance for approximately 12 hours to crew members and Somali pirates aboard Dai Hong Dan. Six pirates were captured, and one was killed. The pirates remained aboard Dai Hong Dan.

On 5 November 2007, James E. Williams and Arleigh Burke provided aid to the crew of MV Ching Fong Hwa 168 (pictured), a Taiwanese-flagged fishing trawler that had been seized by pirates off the coast of Somalia in May. After the Somali pirates returned to shore, the destroyer escorted the Taiwanese ship out of Somali waters and provided needed supplies and medical assistance. Finally, the guided-missile destroyer Forrest Sherman executed a circumnavigation of the African continent while performing theater security operations with local military forces as the flagship of Task Group 60.5, the U.S. Navy's Southeast Africa task force.

Carrier Strike Group Twelve transited the Suez Canal on 1 December 2007, and the group returned to Norfolk on 13 December 2007.

For this deployment, Enterprise received the Battle "E" award, the Battenberg Cup, and the Admiral Flatley Memorial Award for the year 2007. Also during this deployment, the strike group was the second U.S. Navy carrier strike group to deploy with the new ASQ-228 Advanced Targeting Forward Looking Infrared (ATFLIR) targeting system for its F/A-18 strike fighters. This new system allowed its pilots to use their weapon systems at higher altitude with greater accuracy and safety. Finally, the 2007 deployment marked the final cruise for squadron VS-32 and its S-3 Viking aircraft (pictured). During this deployment, VS-32 aircraft flew 960 sorties, which totaled more than 2,200 flight hours, and included more than 950 carrier landings. Squadron VS-32 operated at sea for 180 days with only 13 days spent in port.
2007 deployment force composition

2007–2008 deployment exercises and port visits

2008–2010 operations

On 11 April 2008, Enterprise began a two-year, US$661.7 million Extended Drydocking Selected Restricted Availability (EDSRA) overhaul at the Northrop Grumman Newport News shipyard in Virginia.

While his flagship was going into refit, Rear Admiral Daniel P. Holloway was given the task of supervising Exercise 
BALTOPS 2008, that took place from 8 to 18 June 2008 (pictured). BALTOPS began in 1971 as a NATO freedom of navigation exercise directed against the Soviet Union in the Baltic, and it is now a Partnership for Peace interoperability exercise involving former Warsaw Pact adversaries, including Russia. Holloway used the guided-missile cruiser  as his temporary flagship which was joined by two other U.S. naval vessels, the guided-missile destroyer  from Destroyer Squadron 22 and the fleet oiler  from the Military Sealift Command, to form Task Group 369.4. Gettysburg returned to Naval Station Mayport, Florida, on 14 July 2008.

Enterprise returned to Naval Station Norfolk on 19 April 2010 after completing its post-overhaul sea trials, signalling the start of the pre-deployment training cycle for Carrier Strike Group Twelve.

2011 deployment

On 13 January 2011, Carrier Strike Group Twelve departed its home base of Naval Station Norfolk, Virginia, under the command of Rear Admiral Terry B. Kraft. The strike group entered the U.S. Sixth Fleet's area of responsibility on 20 January 2011 and following its transit of the Suez Canal on 15 February 2011, joined the U.S. Fifth Fleet.

During the 2011 deployment, aircraft from Carrier Air Wing One flew 7764 sorties, with more than 7120 combat sorties in support of Operation Enduring Freedom in Afghanistan. Units of Carrier Strike Group Twelve also disrupted nine piracy attacks, resulting in the capture of 75 suspected pirates and the detention of an additional 18 suspected pirates. Also during this deployment, the guided-missile destroyer Barry was detached from Carrier Strike Group Twelve in order to participate in Operation Odyssey Dawn. During that operation, on 19 March 2011, Barry was credited with launching the 2000th Tomahawk land-attack cruise missile.

In February 2011, Enterprise, Leyte Gulf, Sterrett. and Buckley, as well as the guided-missile destroyer , responded to the seizure of the American yacht Quest by Somali pirates off the coast of Oman. During this event four pirates were killed, and 15 were taken into custody. Enterprise is the first U.S. aircraft carrier to directly support a counter-piracy incident. Enterprise and Leyte Gulf also supported the recapture of the  Liberian-flagged bulk carrier MV Arrilah-1 from Somali pirates by United Arab Emirates special operation forces on 2 April 2011.

Joining Buckley was the Turkish frigate  from NATO's Operation Ocean Shield. After determining that Guanabaras crew was safely in the ship's citadel, Bulkeleys boarding team, supported overhead by its embarked SH-60 helicopter, secured the Bahamian-flagged vessel and detained four suspected pirates (pictured). Three of the pirates were subsequently indicted in Japan, and the fourth was turned over to juvenile authorities, as it was determined that he was a minor.

On 24 March 2011, units from Carrier Strike Group Twelve disrupted a pirate attack on the Philippine-flagged merchant vessel MV Falcon Trader II. While operating in the Arabian Sea in support of Operation Enduring Freedom, at 10:00 A.M. local time, the carrier Enterprise and cruiser Leyte Gulf responded to a distress call from Falcon Trader II reporting that suspected pirates in a small skiff were attempting to board the ship. A follow-up message reported that the pirates had boarded Falcon Trader II, but confirmed that her crew was safely in the ship's citadel. A SH-60F helicopter from squadron HS-11 embarked on Enterprise and a SH-60B helicopter from squadron HSL-48 on board Leyte Gulf were dispatched to investigate the situation. Once on the scene, the HS-11 helicopter fired warning shots at the suspected pirates in the skiff, prompting them to flee the scene. The helicopter pursued the skiff which was observed trying to rendezvous with a suspected pirate mother ship. The helicopter came under small arms fire, but the flight crew were not harmed while the helicopter maintained surveillance of the situation. On 25 March 2011, after determining there were no pirates aboard, Leyte Gulf sent a boarding party to Falcon Trader II to free its crew (pictured).

On 16 May 2011, Bulkeley responded to a mayday call from the Panamanian-flagged, German-owned,  very large crude carrier Artemis Glory. Bulkeley dispatched a SH-60B helicopter to the last reported position of the ship. Observing that a skiff carrying four men was firing upon Artemis Glory, the HSL-48 helicopter opened fire, killing four suspected pirates. Without any Navy or Artemis Glory casualties, the ship was able to continue to its next port-of-call.

On 21 June 2011, the Navy's oldest aircraft carrier – Enterprise – passed the Navy's newest carrier, George H.W. Bush, in the Bab el-Mandeb Strait (pictured) as Carrier Strike Group Two relieved Carrier Strike Group Twelve as the Fifth Fleet's in-theater carrier strike group.<ref>{{cite web | author= Mass Communication Specialist 2nd Class Aaron Chase, USN | title= Enterprise', Bush Conduct Unique Pass in Red Sea | url= http://www.navy.mil/search/display.asp?story_id=61237 | work= NNS110624-13 | publisher=US Navy | agency=USS Enterprise Public Affairs | date= 24 June 2011 | access-date=2 June 2012}}</ref> Carrier Strike Group Twelve transited the Suez Canal on 24 June 2011 and the Strait of Gibraltar on 3 July 2011. On 15 July 2011, the group returned to Naval Station Norfolk, Virginia, completing its 2011 deployment.
2011 deployment force composition

2011 deployment exercises and port visits

2012 deployment

On 11 January 2012, the strike group proceeded to sea for pre-deployment training and its Composite Training Unit Exercise.
From 30 January to 12 February 2012, the group took part in Bold Alligator 2012, the largest amphibious assault exercise held on the east coast of the United States since 2002. Bold Alligator 2012 also served as the group Joint Task Force Exercise, the final pre-deployment training exercise needed to receive its combat-readiness certification. During the exercise, the air wing completed 3,830 flight hours, made 2,052 arrested landings, and received a 96 percent sortie completion rate. This included a single-day total of 107 sorties flown on 6 February 2012 during the exercise amphibious assault phase. U.S. Secretary of Defense Leon Panetta visited Enterprise on 21 January 2012, observing flight operations and meeting members of the crew. The strike group completed its pre-deployment training and returned to Naval Station Norfolk, Virginia, on 10 February 2012.

On 11 March 2012, the group departed Naval Station Norfolk, Virginia, for its 2012 deployment under the command of Rear Admiral Walter E. Carter, Jr. The strike group transited the Strait of Gibraltar on 23 March 2012, and it subsequently conducted a passing exercise with Standing NATO Maritime Group 1 between 24 and 25 March 2012 (pictured).

The strike group transited the Suez Canal to join the U.S. Fifth Fleet on 3 April. On 8 April 2012, the guided-missile destroyer Porter was detached in order to join Combined Task Force 151 for counter-piracy operations in the Gulf of Aden.

On 1 May 2012, Carrier Strike Group Twelve began combat air support to the International Security Assistance Force in Afghanistan, with Carrier Air Wing One flying 29 sorties that first day. The strike group operated with Carrier Strike Group Nine until CSG-9 was relieved by Carrier Strike Group Eight on 16–17 July 2012. In total, aircraft from Carrier Air Wing One flew 9,875 sorties, of which 2,241 were combat missions, while the Enterprise made ten transits through the Strait of Hormuz. The average flight time per sortie was almost six hours per flight. During this deployment, the strike group's longest at-sea period was 52 days.

On the evening of 8 August 2013, the guided-missile destroyer  rescued ten mariners from a burning Iranian-flagged dhow (pictured) while operating in the Gulf of Oman. Of the ten mariners, eight were identified as Iranians and two were Pakistanis. The rescued mariners received medical treatment and transport to the carrier Enterprise before being repatriated back to Iran on 10 August. James E. Williams reentered the Mediterranean Sea on 25 August.

On 12 August 2012, at 1:00 a.m. local time, the guided-missile destroyer  collided with the Panamanian-flagged, Japanese-owned oil tanker MV Otowasan near the Strait of Hormuz. The collision ripped a large hole in Porter's starboard side above the waterline, forcing her to put into Jebel Ali, Dubai, for inspection and repairs. No one on either ship was injured from the collision. Otowasan had been en route from Fujairah, UAE, to Mesaieed, Qatar, at the time of the collision.

On 12 October 2012, the strike group transited the Suez Canal, with Porter rejoining following extensive repairs. On 4 November, Enterprise returned to Naval Base Norfolk, Virginia, after steaming  during its seven-and-a-half-month deployment. and 
2012 deployment force composition

 2012 deployment combat operations, exercises, and port visits

Enterprise inactivates, cruiser changesEnterprise was inactivated on 1 December 2012 at Norfolk Naval Station, Virginia.  was reassigned as the group's new flagship. Carrier Air Wing One was reassigned from Enterprise to Roosevelt.

Initially, the U.S. Navy had planned to retire Vicksburg along with three other s in fiscal year 2013. However, after much discussion, Vicksburg and two other Ticonderoga-class cruisers were retained under the National Defense Authorization Act for Fiscal Year 2013, with Vicksburg joining  as units of Carrier Strike Group Twelve.National Defense Authorization Act for Fiscal Year 2013, p. 5.

On 14 January 2014, the Navy announced that Theodore Roosevelt was to shift its homeport to Naval Base San Diego, California and the U.S. Pacific Fleet.

2013–2014 operations

On 22 October 2012, the Department of Defense announced that Rear Admiral Kevin Kovacich was selected to take command of Carrier Strike Group Twelve. A naval aviator, Admiral Kovacich took command of the strike group on 15 April 2013.Theodore Roosevelt returned to Norfolk Naval Station, Virginia, on 29 August 2013, completing its post-overhaul sea trials that concluded its four-year mid-life Refueling and Complex Overhaul. On 14 September 2013, Theodore Roosevelt successfully completed flight deck certification which entailed completing a total of 160 carrier landings during daytime and night-time operations. Other certification drills included rigging the emergency barricade, flight deck firefighting evolutions, and crash and salvage operations. On 17 September 2013, Theodore Roosevelt completed its first underway replenishment in over four years.

At the start of 2014, Theodore Roosevelt and the rest of Carrier Strike Group Twelve were in port and not underway. On 15 January 2014, Theodore Roosevelt departed Naval Station Norfolk, Virginia, for carrier qualifications prior to undertaking the group pre-deployment exercise. On 20 March 2014, the U.S. Defense Department announced Admiral Kovacich's next assignment was as the director for plans and programs of the U.S. African Command, and his relief was Rear Admiral Andrew L. Lewis, a naval aviator.

Between 4–8 August 2014, Theodore Roosevelt completed the in-port phase of its Tailored Ship's Training Availability (TSTA) exercises. On 16 September 2014, Carrier Strike Group 12 began the at-sea phase of its TSTA exercises, as well as its Final Evaluation Problem (FEP) exercises, completing these exercises on 8 October 2014. On 8 January 2015, Carrier Strike Group 12 began its Composite Training Unit Exercise (COMPTUEX). This three-week-long series of exercises test the strike group's ability to perform as an integrated formation within real-world scenarios prior to departing for its upcoming 2015 overseas deployment. Also, between 9–10 January 2015, Theodore Roosevelt on-loaded munitions during underway replenishment with from the dry cargo ship .

On 4 March 2015, it was reported in a blogspot of the French Navy and French Ministry of Defense that during a recent training exercise off Florida the French nuclear submarine  (pictured) as part of the "enemy" attack group had successfully "sunk" the aircraft carrier Theodore Roosevelt and its escorts.

2015 world cruise

On 9 March 2015, Carrier Strike Group Twelve departed Naval Station Norfolk, Virginia, to begin its 2015 around-the-world deployment. The group's flagship, Theodore Roosevelt, was delayed by a faulty seawater intake valve and did not get underway until 11 March 2015. The 2015 deployment was scheduled to conclude with Theodore Roosevelts arrival at its new homeport of San Diego Naval Base, California. The group was the first U.S. Navy carrier strike group to deploy with the new Naval Integrated Fire Control-Counter Air (NIFC-CA) capability. NIFC-CA integrates all units via data links to gain a more comprehensive overview of its operational battlespace. 

The group came under the operational control of the U.S. Sixth Fleet on 16 March 2015. While en route, on 21 March 2015, the cruiser Normandy recovered more than 1,000 pounds of illegal narcotics after an MH-60 Seahawk from its squadron HSM-46 detachment spotted a small craft dumping large packages into the water (pictured). The strike group transited the Strait of Gibraltar and entered the Mediterranean Sea on 31 March 2015.

Carrier Strike Group Twelve shifted its operational control to the U.S. Fifth Fleet after transiting the Suez Canal on 6 April 2015. Carrier Strike Group Twelve entered the Persian Gulf on 14 April 2015 and, on 16 April 2015, began combat operations in support of Operation Inherent Resolve, the U.S.-led air campaign against ISIL in Iraq and Syria.

These warships were monitoring the deteriorating situation in war-torn Yemen. On 8 September 2015, Farragut rescued three mariners from their disabled fishing vessel in the Red Sea.

On 19 April 2015 Theodore Roosevelt and Normandy transited the Strait of Hormuz to join the ten other U.S. naval units operating in the Gulf of Aden. Theodore Roosevelt and Normandy were moved to monitor an Iranian naval convoy escorted by two Iranian warships suspected of carrying arms to the Houthi rebel forces in Yemen. The Roosevelt was operating within  of the Iranian convoy. The convoy later reversed course and returned home without incident. Theodore Roosevelt and Normandy returned to the Persian Gulf on 24 April 2015.

On 28 April 2015, Iranian Revolutionary Guard patrol craft intercepted and seized the Marshall Islands container cargo ship  while it was transiting the Strait of Hormuz. It made a distress call. Since Maersk Tigris was a Marshalls' vessel, and the United States is responsible for the defense of the Marshalls,  was dispatched. On 30 April 2015, U.S. warship began escorting U.S.-flagged merchant marine vessels through the Strait of Hormuz. On 7 May 2015, Maersk Tigris was released and the U.S. Navy ended its escort operations.

On 12 May 2015, an F/A-18F Super Hornet from squadron VFA-211 crashed in the Persian Gulf shortly after being launched from the carrier Theodore Roosevelt. Both crew members were returned to Theodore Roosevelt after ejecting safely from the aircraft.

On 9 October 2015, Carrier Strike Group 12 transited the Strait of Hormuz, completing its deployment with Operation Inherent Resolve. During this deployment, the strike group launched 1,812 combat air sorties and expended 1,085 precision-guided munitions. On 23 November 2015, the strike group's flagship, USS Theodore Roosevelt, arrived at its new homeport, NAS North Island in San Diego, California, completing its eight-and-a-half-month long world cruise. 
2015 deployment force composition 

 2015 deployment combat operations, exercises, and port visits

2019 deployment
On 1 April 2019,  and Carrier Strike Group 12 departed Norfolk for a six-month deployment. On 9 April Abraham Lincoln'' arrived in the United States Sixth Fleet area of operations, for operations in the Mediterranean Sea before proceeding to the Persian Gulf, then the Indian Ocean and the South China Sea, before heading across the Pacific Ocean to her new homeport at San Diego. On 5 May 2019 this deployment was diverted to the Middle East due to tensions with Iran.

Strike group commanders 2004-2020
Commander Carrier Strike Group Twelve (COMCARSTRKGRU 12 or CCSG 12) is responsible for unit-level training, integrated training, and material readiness for the ships and aviation squadrons assigned to the group. When deployed overseas, the group comes under command of the numbered fleet (i.e., Third, Fourth, Fifth, Sixth, or Seventh) in whose area it is operating, and will have a task force or task group designator, for example, Task Group 50.1 in the Fifth Fleet area.

Group commanders since 2004 have included:

See also
 U.S. Carrier Group tactics

Notes

Citations

References
 
 
 
 
 
 
 

Carrier Strike Groups
Military in San Diego
Military units and formations established in 2004